Umrad is a village in the Karmala taluka of Solapur district in Maharashtra state, India.

Demographics
Covering  and comprising 751 households at the time of the 2011 census of India, Umrad had a population of 3492. There were 1829 males and 1663 females, with 435 people being aged six or younger.

References

Villages in Karmala taluka